J.J.I. Alcide de Paladilhe (1814–1876) was a French malacologist.
 
He wrote (1866-1869) Nouvelles miscellanées malacologiques  par M. le Docteur Paladilhe Paris :Chez Savy,(1866-1869) online here   at Biodiversity Heritage Library

Paladilhe's collection is in the Natural History Museum of Geneva

References
Haasiana Newsletter number  6 2012 

French malacologists